Yukon Island is an island in outer Kachemak Bay, an inlet of the Cook Inlet of south central Alaska. The island is archaeologically sensitive, with a number of sites documenting the prehistory of the bay. The Yukon Island Main Site, a National Historic Landmark, is a major shell midden site at which the pioneering archaeologist Frederica de Laguna was able to sequence 1500 years of the area's prehistory, and other sites have been found on the island since then. The island is now home to an educational retreat center.

Description
It has a rocky shoreline with steep, eroding cliffs, and a rugged interior forested with sitka spruce and hemlock.

The island is located near the south shore of the mouth of Kachemak Bay, an inlet on the east side of Cook Inlet.  The bay is a biologically rich environment in comparison to Cook Inlet and the outer shores of the Kenai Peninsula.  Its location is of strategic benefit to small craft negotiating the coastline.

Archaeology
The Main Site on the island was discovered in 1924, at which time ancient female human remains were discovered in an eroding shell midden.  The site was investigated in depth by Frederica de Laguna in the 1930s, as a result of which she was able to construct a 1500-year chronology of use.  Her work laid the foundation for later research in the region, which has largely confirmed her initial timeline.  This site has been a regular subject of archaeological research; it was designated a National Historic Landmark in 1962, and was listed on the National Register of Historic Places in 1966.  This site was particularly affected by the 1964 earthquake, and is subject to erosion.

A detailed survey of the island identified five additional midden sites in 1976. The midden is part of what is interpreted as a village site, which has yielded radio carbon dates of CE 1100–1300.

Yukon Island Center
The Yukon Island Center is an educational retreat center located on a small portion of the island.  Built on land cleared in the 1970s, its construction and opening were delayed by the discovery of archaeological sites at its planned location.  Opened in 1991, it hosts education groups of 50–60 people.

See also
List of National Historic Landmarks in Alaska
National Register of Historic Places listings in Kenai Peninsula Borough, Alaska

References

External links
Yukon Island Center web site

Buildings and structures in Kenai Peninsula Borough, Alaska
Native American history of Alaska
Islands of Alaska
Archaeological sites in Alaska